recfiles is a file format for human-editable, plain text databases.

Databases using this file format can be edited using any text editor. recfiles allow for basic relational database operations, typing, auto-incrementing, as well as a simple join operation.

Recutils is a collection of tools, like recfmt, recsel, and rec2csv used to work with recfile databases.
Various software libraries support the format.

Syntax
Data are stored in text files with empty lines separating records. Fields within a record are lines starting with their name and a colon; it is possible to wrap long entries. Multiple record types can be maintained in a single text file.

Example
# This is a recfile document.

%rec: Texts
%type: Year int

Author: Doug McIlroy
Year: 1964
Note: The Origin of Unix Pipes

Title: Unix Text Processing
Author: Dale Dougherty
Author: Tim O'Reilly
Year: 1987
Publisher: Hayden Books

Author: William Shakespeare
Title: Hamlet
Year: 1599
Year: 1600
Year: 1601

This example command would output the following three lines (of the two original entries, one having two authors):
$ recsel -e 'Year > "1900"' -p Author
Author: Doug McIlroy
Author: Dale Dougherty
Author: Tim O'Reilly

See also 
 asciidoc
 TOML
 org-mode

References

Computer file formats
Computer-related introductions in 2010
Data serialization formats
Lightweight markup languages
Open formats